Brennan Point is an ice-covered headland forming the eastern side of the entrance to Block Bay on the coast of Marie Byrd Land; Brennan Point forms a border between Saunders Coast and Ruppert Coast. It was discovered on the Byrd Antarctic Expedition (1928–30) (ByrdAE) flight along this coast on December 5, 1929, and named for Michael J. Brennan, who was advisory on the ByrdAE in the selection of personnel, and skipper of the Chantier on the trip to the Arctic when Richard E. Byrd flew over the North Pole.

References

 

Headlands of Marie Byrd Land